Ağqışlaq (also, Agkyshlak and Ag-Kishlag) is a village and municipality in the Lerik Rayon of Azerbaijan.  It has a population of 210.

References 

Populated places in Lerik District